Gari is a rural locality (a village) in Polozovoskoye Rural Settlement, Bolshesosnovsky District, Perm Krai, Russia. The population was 51 as of 2010. There are 2 streets.

Geography 
It is located on the Siva River.

References 

Rural localities in Bolshesosnovsky District